Bălăceana ( is a commune located in Suceava County, Bukovina, northeastern Romania. It is composed of a single village, namely Bălăceana. This was part of Ilișești commune (theretofore called Ciprian Porumbescu) until 2004, when it was split off, along with Ciprian Porumbescu village; both formed separate communes.

References 

Communes in Suceava County
Localities in Southern Bukovina